Moreno Valley/March Field is a train station in unincorporated Riverside County, California, United States, near the Moreno Valley and the March Air Reserve Base, after which the station is named. It opened on June 6, 2016, along with the Perris Valley Line extension of the Metrolink commuter rail system.

References

External links 

Metrolink stations in Riverside County, California
2016 establishments in California
Railway stations in the United States opened in 2016
Moreno Valley, California